is a railway station on the Asatō Line in Tōyō, Aki District, Kōchi Prefecture, Japan. It is operated by the third sector Asa Kaigan Railway and bears the station number "TK30". DMV commenced operation from 2021, so this station has become a signal station at which passengers don't get on and off. The DMV stops at the bus terminal near this station.

Lines
Only DMV stop in front of the station.

Layout
The station consisted of a side platform serving an elevated track. With the DMV service, the platform is not open to the public anymore, but it is possible to observe the mode change of the DMV at the Plattform entrance. 

Bicycle and car parking facilities are available and bike rentals are offered. Access to the platform is by means of a flight of steps next to the station building.

Asa Seaside Railway will be operating on the Asato Line by dual-mode vehicles for the first time in the world. The DMV runs to and from this station as trains or to and from this station as buses. The changeover facilities for DMV operation were constructed in 2020.

Adjacent stations

History
The station was opened on 26 March 1992 by the third sector Asa Kaigan Railway as the southern terminus of the three station Asatō Line.

Passenger statistics
In fiscal 2011, the station was used by an average of 40 passengers daily.

Bus terminal

DMV
 Asa Seaside Railway
 For Awa-Kainan Bunkamura via Asato Line
 For Umi no Eki Toyo・Michi no Eki Shishikui Onsen 
  For Cape Muroto (Only on holidays)

Route buses
 Tokushima Bus Nambu
 For Kannoura guchi・Shishikui Station・Kaifu Station・Awa-Kainan Station・Asakawa Station・Sabase Station・Mugi Station
 Kochi Tobu Kotsu

This route is a bustitution of Asa Line.

Expressway buses

Kannoura bus stop
This bus stop is located near Kannoura Junior highschool and Kannoura guchi bus stop.

See also
 List of railway stations in Japan

References

External links
 Asa Kaigan Railway Official website 

Railway stations in Kōchi Prefecture
Railway stations in Japan opened in 1992